Chaerophyllum aureum is a species of flowering plant belonging to the family Apiaceae.

Its native range is Central and Southern Europe, Crimea, Turkey to Iran.

References

aureum